The Laird School of Art was a school of art situated on Park Road North, Birkenhead, Merseyside, England, overlooking Birkenhead Park. It was the first public school of art outside London and was given to the town by John Laird. The school opened on 27 September 1871 and was closed in 1980 when it merged with the Birkenhead College of Technology, formerly situated on Borough Road. The building on Park Road North is used as the John Laird Centre.

Notable alumni
 Trena Cox, stained glass artist.
 Martin Cooper of the band Orchestral Manoeuvres in the Dark.

References

Sources

Educational institutions established in 1871
Education in Birkenhead
Art schools in England
1871 establishments in England